Pattimura International Airport  is an airport in Ambon, Maluku. The airport is located 38 kilometers west of the city of Ambon. The airport was named after Pattimura (1783–1817), an Indonesian national hero who fought against the Dutch colonialists in the nineteenth century. Pattimura Airport is an airport located in Ambon City, Maluku Province, Indonesia. The airport also caters for domestic and overseas trips. The airport is 35 kilometers outside Ambon City with travel time approximately 30–45 minutes. At this airport there are immigration facilities, quarantine, customs, cargo building, restaurant, public phone, and post office. Pattimura Airport Ambon is a very strategic area in the Maluku Islands which is divided into two provinces namely, North Maluku and Maluku.
Pattimura Ambon Airport is located in Ambon Island, located in Maluku Province.

History

The airport was established by the Dutch in 1939 as Laha Airfield. In early February 1942 during WW2, the airport was captured by the Japanese after fierce fighting with Allied defenders during the Dutch East Indies Campaign. Following its capture, Japanese forces executed over 300 Australian and Dutch POWs who had surrendered at the airfield. The base was used extensively by the Japanese through the war. After the independence of Indonesia was proclaimed, Pattimura was used as an air base. This lasted until August 1, 1962, when the government formed a working unit in charge of organizing the civil aviation maintenance and operation of airports for the benefit of civil air transport. Pattimura Airport continued to be operated as an Air Force Air Base. Based on the Joint Decree of the Minister of Defense / Armed Forces Commander, Minister of Transportation and Minister of Finance, in 1975, Pattimura airport was designated as a civilian airfield and came under the full control of the Department of Transportation. On October 11, 1995, the management of the Pattimura Airport was transferred to PT. Angkasa Pura I (Persero), a state-owned enterprises that manages several airports in central and eastern Indonesia.

Facilities 
This airport is located 36 kilometers from the city of Ambon. It has an immigration office, a quarantine facility, a tax office, a cargo storage building, several small restaurants, public pay phones, and a post office. Free wi-fi internet is available throughout the airport.

The international terminal is 1,200 m2 (gates C & D) and has an annual capacity of 70,000 passengers.  The domestic terminal is 7,393 m2 (gates A & B) and has an annual capacity of 406,000 passengers.

Currently there are no regularly scheduled international flights to or from Ambon, so the international terminal is used for domestic flights which are operated with larger airplanes and can make use of the two jet bridges for easier loading and unloading of the airplanes – especially during rain.

The cargo terminal size is 1,192 m2. The outside parking area is 8,574 m2.

Airlines and destinations

Passenger

Proposed development
Pattimura Airport has a capacity of 800 thousand people, while in fact, the airport has served 1.3 million people per year. Therefore, when hearing the news, Minister of State-Owned Enterprises (SOE), Rini M. Soemarmo immediately followed up the report by telephoning the main director of Angkasa Pura (AP) I. According to AP I president, airport development has been planned. This is evidenced by the absence of development design, namely the addition of one terminal, including the addition of garbarata. Despite the news, the minister is still worried that by the end of 2017 the total number of passengers will be 1.5 million.

Former International routes
Since 1998, there have been no international routes operating out of the Pattimura International Airport.  Previously there was a flight from Ambon to Darwin, Australia.  There have been occasional flights to Darwin at the time of the various boating events, but no regularly scheduled international flights since 1998.  Recently there has been talk of resuming international flights out of Ambon, but nothing specific has been announced yet.

Land transportation

DAMRI Bus 
Perum DAMRI has buses operated to connect the airport to the surrounding area. During this time, this bus journey only has one route. The route is Pattimura International Airport-Merdeka Square.
Bus routes from the airport to Lapangan Merdeka are as follows.
Pattimura-Hative Besar Besar-Wayame-Poka -Humah Tiga-Waiheru- Nania-Passo-Lateri-Halong-Galala-Batu Batu-Kantor DPRD-Hotel Manise-Hotel Amboina-Tugu Trikora-Mangga Dua-Insurance Office Jasindo Ambon-Hotel Abdulalie -The AY Path Patty-Lapangan Merdeka.
Bus routes from Merdeka Square to the airport are as follows.
Merdeka-Supermarket Ground-Citra-Batu Merah-Galala-Halong-Lateri-Passo-Nania-Waiheru-Poka-Big Three-Wayame-Hative House-Pattimura Airport

Taxi 
Taxis also operate to connect this airport. Taxis serving this airport has two types of cars, namely sedans and minibuses. In the past, passengers still had to pay a ferry to cross Ambon Bay. However, there is now a Red and White Bridge that shorten the time.

Incidents
 On 24 July 1992, Mandala Airlines Flight 660 crashed when on approach to Pattimura Airport. All 70 passengers and crew on board were killed.
 On 7 June 1997, a Merpati Nusantara Airlines flight collided with a tree on approach but was able to land safely.
 On 2 January 2007, Lion Air Flight JT 797 skidded on the runway stopping just 4 meters before the end of the runway.  Neither the plane nor any of the passengers were injured, but a runway light was damaged.  The accident occurred at 8:14am during heavy rains.

Gallery

References

External links
 PT Angkasa Pura I 2016 Annual Report 

Ambon, Maluku
Airports in Maluku